Anju Jadhav is an Indian actress. She is best known for her roles in television shows such as Sankat Mochan Mahabali Hanumaan, Kuch Rang Pyar Ke Aise Bhi, Kasautii Zindagii Kay and  Wagle Ki Duniya – Nayi Peedhi Naye Kissey. . In 2019, She made her debut in Bollywood with Dosti Ke Side Effects.

Career
Jadhav was a part of Mahabharat where  she played the role of Sukhanda and Sankat Mochan Mahabali Hanumaan where she played the role of Saraswati. She played the role of Tina in Kuch Rang Pyar Ke Aise Bhi in 2016. She also acted in Dil Deke Dekho where she played the role of Preet Shastri. She was part of Kasautii Zindagii Kay too where she played the role of Anjali.

Jadhav made her debut in Bollywood with Dosti Ke Side Effects in 2019. She played Swara Rane in Tujhse Hai Raabta from 2019 to 2020.

Filmography

Television

Film

References

External links
 

Living people
Indian television actresses
Indian soap opera actresses
Actresses in Hindi television
Indian film actresses
Actresses in Hindi cinema
1993 births